Huang Huahua (born October 1946 in Xingning, Guangdong) is a retired Chinese politician, and the Governor of Guangdong between 2003 and 2011. Of Hakka heritage, he was once the mayor of Meizhou.

Biography 
Huang was born in Xingning County, Guangdong. Huang graduated in mathematics from  Sun Yat-sen University.

From 1970 to 1978, Huang worked at a machinery factory of the Guangdong Coal Mine, joined the Communist Party in 1971 and served as deputy secretary of the workshop Party Branch. He was later promoted to secretary of the Communist Youth League of China (CYLC) Shaoguan Municipal Committee.

Huang was deputy secretary of the CYLC provincial committee from 1982 to 1985 and then secretary of CYLC provincial committee from 1985 to 1987.

Prior to becoming mayor of Meixian, Huang served as deputy secretary of the CCP Meixian Prefectural Committee.

He was Mayor of Meizhou (1988–1992) and subsequently the CCP party chief in Guangzhou. In January 2003, Huang was made Governor of Guangdong.

The stepping down of Huang as governor in 2011 marked the end of the dominance of the provincial government by the "Hakka clique". In December 2011, Huang was made a deputy chair of the National People's Congress Overseas Chinese Affairs Committee.

Huang was an alternate member of the 15th Central Committee of the Chinese Communist Party, and a full member of the 16th and 17th Central Committees.

References

 China Vitae – Huang Huahua 黄华华
 Who's Who in China's Leadership

1946 births
Living people
Hakka people
Governors of Guangdong
People from Xingning
Sun Yat-sen University alumni
People's Republic of China politicians from Guangdong
Chinese Communist Party politicians from Guangdong
Politicians from Meizhou